American Tuna: The Rise and Fall of an Improbable Food is a 2012 non-fiction book by Andrew F. Smith, published by the University of California Press.

The work describes how tuna became popular as a food in the United States, and how said popularity ebbed. The first part, covering the former, is titled "Rise" while the latter is titled "Fall".

References

Notes

Further reading

External links
 Available at JSTOR (DOI 10.1525/j.ctt7zw4r4)
 American Tuna
University of California Press books
2012 non-fiction books